Jean Gobet (20 July 1888 – 29 April 1980) was a French stage and film actor.

Filmography

Cinema 

 1928: Les Fourchambault by Georges Monca
 1931: L'Amour à l'américaine by Claude Heymann
 1931: Coiffeur pour dames by René Guissart – Gaetan
 1931: La Couturière de Luneville by Harry Lachmann
 1931: The Man at Midnight by Harry Lachmann – Mr. Durand Toucourt
 1931: The Chocolate Girl by Marc Allégret – Hector
 1931: You Will Be a Duchess by René Guissart – the doctor
 1931: Isolons-nous Octave by Marc Allégret – short film –
 1931: Le Seul Bandit du village by Robert Bossis – short film –
 1932: Baby by Carl Lamac and Pierre Billon
 1932: The Yellow Dog by Jean Tarride – the salesman
 1932: Kiki by Carl Lamac and Pierre Billon
 1932: Ma femme... homme d'affaires by Max de Vaucorbeil – the impresario
 1932: Austerlitz 24-22 by André Bay – short film 
 1932: La Der des ders by Jean Caret – short film 
 1932: En plein dans le mille by André Chotin – Octave
 1932: La Méthode Crollington by André Bay – short film
 1932: Mimi Pandore by Roger Capellani 
 1932: Ordonnance malgré lui by Maurice Cammage – Le vicomte de Marchevieule
 1933: L'Ordonnance by Victor Tourjansky
 1933:  by Karl Anton
 1933: Trois hommes en habit by Mario Bonnard – André
 1933: La Voix sans visage by Leo Mittler – the servant
 1933: Je suis un homme perdu by Edmond T. Gréville 
 1933: Mon chapeau by Lucien Jaquelux – short film
 1934: On a trouvé une femme nue by Léo Joannon – Robert
 1934: The Midnight Prince by René Guissart
 1934: Si j'étais le patron by Richard Pottier – a shareholder
 1935: Baccara by Yves Mirande and Léonide Moguy (first assistant-director) – the friendly journalist
 1935:   by Richard Eichberg and Germain Fried – Georges's friend
 1935: La Route impériale by Marcel L'Herbier – the barman
 1936: With a Smile by Maurice Tourneur – Bruzin
 1936: The King by Pierre Colombier – Rivelot
 1937: Alexis, gentleman chauffeur by Max de Vaucorbeil – the make-up artist
 1937: Mon député et sa femme by Maurice Cammage
 1938: La Marraine du régiment by Gabriel Rosca
 1938: Tricoche and Cacolet by Pierre Colombier – Breloque, the secretary
 1941: Caprices by Léo Joannon
 1942: Mermoz by Louis Cuny
 1943: Le Bal des passants by Guillaume Radot – Jean Lamire
 1945: Vingt-quatre heures de perm' by Maurice Cloche – the dramaturge
 1945: Messieurs Ludovic by Jean-Paul Le Chanois – Benoist
 1949: Les Nouveaux Maîtres by Paul Nivoix
 1953: Les Détectives du dimanche by Claude Orval

Television 
 1965: : Sans-souci ou Le Chef-d'œuvre de Vaucanson by Albert Husson, TV director Jean-Pierre Decourt

Theatre 
 1921: Vive Boulbasse by Régis Gignoux, Théâtre du Grand-Guignol  
 1923: L'Appel du clown by Régis Gignoux, Théâtre du Grand-Guignol  
 1934: L'Été by Jacques Natanson, mise en scène Marcel André, Nouvelle Comédie
 1935: Les Fontaines lumineuses by Georges Berr and Louis Verneuil, Théâtre des Variétés
 1947: Ruy Blas by Victor Hugo, mise en scène Pierre Dux, Comédie-Française  
 1950: Mort pour rien by Alfred Fabre-Luce, mise en scène René Rocher, Théâtre de l'Œuvre
 1952: N'écoutez pas, mesdames ! by Sacha Guitry, mise en scène by the author, Théâtre des Variétés
 1955: La Monnaie de ses rêves by André Ransan, mise en scène René Rocher, Théâtre du Grand-Guignol
 1955: La Tueuse by André-Paul Antoine, Théâtre du Grand-Guignol    
 1956: Je suis seule ce soir by André-Paul Antoine, mise en scène René Rocher, Théâtre du Grand-Guignol
 1956: Meurtre au ralenti by Boileau-Narcejac, mise en scène Alfred Pasquali, Théâtre du Grand-Guignol

External links 
 

French male stage actors
French male film actors
People from Rhône (department)
1888 births
1980 deaths